Alexeyevsky District is a territorial division (a district, or raion) in North-Eastern Administrative Okrug, one of the 125 in the federal city of Moscow, Russia. It is located in the northeast of the federal city. As of the 2010 Census, the total population of the district was 78,421.

The district is named after the village of Alexeyevo, which existed on this site before urbanization. It is largely centered on Mira Avenue. The famous Worker and Kolkhoz Woman statue, as well as Cosmonauts Alley, are located in Alexeyevsky District. There are two metro stations are situated on Alexeyevsky District: VDNH and Alexeyevskaya.

As a municipal division, the district is incorporated as Alexeyevsky Municipal Okrug.

References

Notes

Sources

Districts of Moscow
North-Eastern Administrative Okrug